AREsite is a database of AU-rich elements (ARE) in vertebrate mRNA 3'-untranslated regions (UTRs). AU-rich elements are involved in the control of gene expression. They are the most common determinant of RNA stability in mammalian cells. The most recent version of AREsite is called AREsite 2. It represents an update that allows for more detailed analysis of ARE, GRE, and URE (AU, GU, and U-rich elements).

See also
 AU-rich elements

References

External links
 http://rna.tbi.univie.ac.at/AREsite

Biological databases
RNA
Gene expression
Cis-regulatory RNA elements